Laxman Gouda was a Politician in Odisha. He has served as the Member of Legislative Assembly for Malkangiri and Padwa.

References

Living people
Odisha politicians
Year of birth missing (living people)